Mount Tecumseh is a mountain located in Grafton County, New Hampshire. The mountain is named after the Shawnee leader Tecumseh (–1813), and is a part of the White Mountains. The east side of Tecumseh drains into the Mad River; the west side drains into several brooks. All are tributaries of the Pemigewasset River, which drains into the Merrimack River and thence into the Gulf of Maine in Massachusetts.

Mount Tecumseh is the site of the Waterville Valley Resort, one of the largest ski areas in New Hampshire.

Long believed to stand 4,003 feet in height, Mt. Tecumseh was the lowest on the Appalachian Mountain Club list of "four-thousand footers." As of July 2019, however, a new survey marker on the summit indicates an elevation of 3,997 feet.

Gallery

See also

 List of mountains in New Hampshire
 List of memorials to Tecumseh
 White Mountain National Forest

References

External links
 "Hiking Mount Tecumseh". Appalachian Mountain Club.
  "Mt. Tecumseh". HikeTheWhites.com.
  "Mt. Tecumseh". FranklinSites.com Hiking Guide

Mountains of New Hampshire
Mountains of Grafton County, New Hampshire
New England Four-thousand footers